On the Way to Berlin is a 1969 Soviet drama film directed by Mikhail Yershov.

Plot

The movie is based on Two in the Steppe, a story by the famous Soviet veteran writer Emmanuil Kazakevich and war diaries by Konstantin Simonov. 1942. A military tribunal is investigating the actions of an arrested inexperienced young lieutenant Ogarkov. Officer Ivan Sinyayev, who was on a mission together with Ogarkov, thinks that Ogarkov showed cowardice. The military court sentences Ogarkov to be shot. Private Dzhurabayev is to guard the detainee until the execution of the sentence. Suddenly the Germans enter the village, breaking through the defenses. Dzhurabayev takes the only right decision - to break through to his troops together with Ogarkov. And now a guard and a prisoner are walking along the military roads, engaging in random battles as equals. They cover themselves with the same overcoat, eat from the same tin. A silent, impossible friendship develops between them...

Cast 
 Vasiliy Krasnov as Aleksey Petrov
 Nikolay Trofimov as Ivan Zaytsev
 Gennadi Karnovich-Valua as Sergey Konovalov
 Stepan Krylov as Council of War Member
 Yuri Fisenko as Tolya
 Sergey Dvoretskiy as Volodya Kravchenko
 Geliy Sysoev as Krutikov
 Nikolay Kuzmin as Gabidullin
 Pavel Pervushin as Pyotr Lukich
 Mikhail Yekaterininsky as Leonid Sergeyevich
 Nikolai Fyodortsov as Battalion Commander (as Nikolay Fedortsov)

References

External links 
 

1969 films
1960s Russian-language films
Soviet drama films
1969 drama films